Valentina Chepiga, more precisely Valentyna Chepiha (born April 27, 1962) is a professional female bodybuilder.

Background
Valentina graduated from the Kharkiv National University of Construction and Architecture with a degree in Gas Heating, Ventilation and Air-Conditioning. Between 1979 and 1992 she worked first as a technician, and then was promoted to engineer.

Bodybuilding career

Amateur
Valentina began bodybuilding in 1988, and in 1992 she changed careers and became a personal trainer. Valentina won the European and World Amateur title in 1997 and won her IFBB pro card.

Professional
She then made her professional debut at the 1998 Ms. Olympia contest, finishing in 12th place.  Her greatest success as a professional has been winning the heavyweight class at the 2000 Ms. Olympia the first time that class was introduced to the Ms. Olympia.  No overall winner was named for that show, so she was essentially co-Ms. Olympia with lightweight class winner Andrulla Blanchette. In 2002, she took part in Ms. International, where she won the lightweight class. After a three-year break from competition, Chepiga returned to the stage at the 2007 Ms. Olympia, placing eleventh.

Legacy
Currently, she is the most successful Ukrainian bodybuilder in the world, by being the only Ukrainian to win the Ms. Olympia. From October 22, 2000 to October 26, 2001 she ranked 1st on the IFBB Women's Bodybuilding Professional Ranking List.

Contest history
1993 European Championships - 3rd (MW)
1994 European Championships - 2nd (MW)
1994 World Amateur Championships - 7th (MW)
1995 World Amateur Championships - 7th (MW)
1997 European Championships - 1st (MW)
1997 World Amateur Championships - 1st (MW and Overall)
1998 IFBB Ms. Olympia - 12th
1999 Jan Tana Classic - 3rd
1999 IFBB Ms. Olympia - 12th
2000 Jan Tana Classic - 1st (MW)
2000 IFBB Ms. Olympia - 1st (HW)
2001 IFBB Ms. Olympia - 4th (HW)
2002 Ms. International - 1st (LW)
2002 IFBB Ms. Olympia - 2nd (LW)
2002 GNC Show of Strength - 1st (LW)
2003 Ms. International - 5th (LW)
2004 IFBB Ms. Olympia - 8th (LW)
2007 IFBB Ms. Olympia - 11th

Personal life
She moved to Kyiv, Ukraine in 1993, and then to the United States in 1999, settling in Seattle, Washington.  Valentina now lives in Anchorage, Alaska.

References

External links
 Profile at Bodybuilders.com
 News Story

| colspan = 3 align = center | Ms. Olympia 
|- 

| colspan = 3 align = center | Ms. International 
|- 
| width = 30% align = center | Preceded by:Dayana Cadeau
| width = 40% align = center | First (2002)
| width = 30% align = center | Succeeded by:Cathy LeFrançois

1962 births
Living people
Professional bodybuilders
Sportspeople from Anchorage, Alaska
Sportspeople from Kharkiv
Sportspeople from Kyiv
Sportspeople from Seattle
Ukrainian expatriate sportspeople in the United States
Ukrainian female bodybuilders